Ahmed Said, sometimes addressed by his nickname Okka, is a former Egyptian football player. He was selected a part of the Egypt national team for the 2009 Confederations Cup under Hassan Shehata and participated in all of the 3 matches of the first round. He has also been selected a part of the Egypt national team under new coach Bob Bradley, however his appearances have been few.

References

External links
 

1984 births
Living people
Egyptian footballers
Egypt international footballers
2009 FIFA Confederations Cup players
Lierse S.K. players
Egyptian expatriate footballers
Expatriate footballers in Belgium
Egyptian Premier League players
Association football defenders
Wadi Degla SC players
Smouha SC players
Haras El Hodoud SC players
Ismaily SC players
El Shams SC players
Egyptian expatriate sportspeople in Belgium
El Gouna FC players
El Entag El Harby SC players
Pyramids FC players
Misr Lel Makkasa SC players